Juha Hernesniemi (born 1947) is a Finnish neurosurgeon and professor emeritus of the neurosurgery department in Helsinki. He has a special interest in cerebrovascular diseases that are surgically amenable, especially aneurysms and AVMs. He has published extensively and is widely cited within this particular domain of neurosurgery.

Education
1973 	Medical Doctor (MD) 
1979 	Doctor of Medical Science (PhD) 
1998 	Professor in Neurosurgery

Present position and contact information (as of October 2015) 
Professor Emeritus, Department of Neurosurgery in Helsinki University Hospital, Töölö
Working as Visiting Professor and Head of Neurosurgery at Nobel Institute for Neurosciences Biratnagar Nepal

Specialization 
1979	Specialization in Neurosurgery 
1987	Associate Professor

Work experience 
1979-1983	Senior consultant in neurosurgical departments (Helsinki, Kuopio and Uppsala) 
1983-1991	Assistant Chief Physician, Neurosurgery Department, Kuopio University Hospital 
1991-1992	Chief Physician, Neurosurgery Department, Kuopio University Hospital 
1992-1993	Research and Teaching Fellow, Neurosurgery Department, University of Miami 
1993-1997	Chief Physician of Neurosurgery Department, Kuopio University Hospital 
1997-2015	Chairman, Department of Neurosurgery in Helsinki University Hospital, Töölö
2015-now          various ad-hoc appointments as visiting professor in Peru, Italy, Nepal

Memberships in scientific advisory boards 
1999-	Member of International Advisory Board, Neurosurgery 
1999-2008	Member of International Advisory Board, Surgical Neurology 
2002	Member of International Advisory Board, Zentralblatt für Neurochirurgie 
2008-	Associate Editor, Surgical Neurology

Other academic and professional activities 
Supervisor for 8 doctoral dissertations 
Co-supervisor for 5 doctoral dissertations 
General Secretary for 2 International Congresses: 40th Annual Meeting of the Scandinavian Neurosurgical Society, Kuopio 1989 and EANS Winter Meeting Kuopio, Finland, 1994

Personal neurosurgical operative experience 
14,000 operations including: 
cerebral aneurysm >4,000 patients 
intracranial AVM and DAVF >500 patients 
brain tumour >3,000 patients 
head injury >600 patients 
cervical spine >800 patients 
lumbar spine >300 patients 
spinal tumour >300 patients

Visits and study periods at Neurosurgery Departments world-wide
 Universitas Padjadjaran, Indonesia (visiting professor), 2016
 University of Frankfurt, Germany (Prof. Seifert, Prof. Raabe), 2004
 University of Padua, Italy (Prof. Scienza, Prof. Pavesi), 2003	
 University of Utrecht, The Netherlands (Prof. Tulleken), 2002	
 University of Arkansas, Little Rock, AR, USA (Prof. Yasargil, Prof. Al Mefty, Prof. Khrist), 2001
 University of Mainz, Germany (Prof. Perneczky), 1998	
 University of Zürich; Switzerland (Prof. Yonekawa), 1997	
 University of Miami, FL, USA (Prof. Peerless, Prof. Drake, Prof. Rosomoff, Prof. Green), 1992 - 1993
 University of Zürich, Switzerland (Prof. Yasargil), 1992	
 Hospital Notre Dame, Montreal, Canada (Prof. Bertrand), 1991	
 Semmelweis University Budapest, Hungary (Prof. Nyáry, Prof. Vajda), 1991	
 Department of Clinical Neurological Sciences, London, Canada (Prof. Peerless, Prof. Drake), 1989
 The National Hospital, London, UK (Prof. Symon, Prof. Crockard), 1988
 Semmelweis University Budapest, Hungary (Prof. Pásztor), 1984	
 University of Zürich, Switzerland (Prof. Yasargil), 1982	
 University of Bucharest, Romania (Prof. Arseni), 1978

References

http://www.linnc.com/Physicians/Juha-HERNESNIEMI
http://www.bbraun.com/documents/Nanosites/HelsinkiBook_Bookmarks_V1.pdf (knowledgeable booklet about Helsinki neurosurgery style, co-authored by Juha Hernesniemi)
http://surgicalneurologyint.com/1001-hernesniemi-videos (a developing database of videos of Prof.J.Hernesiemi's work)

1947 births
Living people
People from Kannus
Finnish neurosurgeons
Academic staff of the University of Helsinki